Flashlight Seasons is the second album by the British singer-songwriter Gravenhurst. Originally released on a trio of labels - Red Square in the USA, Sink & Stove and Silent Age Records in the UK - it was re-released with new sleeve artwork and packaging worldwide on Warp Records in 2004.

Track listing
 "Tunnels" - 4:44
 "Fog Round the Figurehead" - 4:40
 "I Turn My Face to the Forest Floor" - 3:52
 "Bluebeard" - 4:26
 "The Diver" - 5:29
 "East of the City" - 2:36
 "Damage" - 4:23
 "Damage II" - 3:05
 "The Ice Tree" - 5:29
 "Hopechapel Hill" - 4:42

2003 albums
Gravenhurst (band) albums
Warp (record label) albums